National Route 366 is a national highway of Japan connecting Handa, Aichi and Atsuta-ku, Nagoya within Japan, with a total length of 20.1 km (12.49 mi).

References

National highways in Japan
Roads in Aichi Prefecture